Taoyuan Pauian Pilots (Chinese: 桃園璞園領航猿) is a professional basketball team based in Taoyuan, Taiwan. They have been part of P. League+ since the 2020–21 season.

In 2020, following the establishment of P. League+, Super Basketball League team Taoyuan Pauian Archiland splitted the team in two, which one of both joined P. League+ and rebranded to Taoyuan AirApe. The AirApe became one of the four teams of the inaugural P. League+ season.

On November 1, 2020, the AirApe was renamed to Taoyuan Pilots. On October 6, 2022, the team was renamed Taoyuan Pauian Pilots.

Facilities

Home arenas

Roster

Notable players

Season-by-season record

Statistical leaders and awards

Franchise leaders

References

External links
 
 

 
2020 establishments in Taiwan
Basketball teams established in 2020